Fusinus alcyoneum is a species of sea snail, a marine gastropod mollusk in the family Fasciolariidae, the spindle snails, the tulip snails and their allies.

Description
The length of the shell attains 37.3 mm.

Distribution
This marine species occurs off New Caledonia.

References

 Hadorn R. & Fraussen K. 2006. Five new species of Fusinus (Gastropoda: Fasciolariidae) from western Pacific and Arafura Sea. Novapex 7(4): 91-102.

alcyoneum
Gastropods described in 2006